Mancinella armigera is a species of sea snail, a marine gastropod mollusk, in the family Muricidae, the murex snails or rock snails.

Description
The size of an adult shell varies between 50 mm and 105.5 mm.

Distribution
This species is distributed in the Indian Ocean along Chagos, the Aldabra Atoll and Tanzania; in the Pacific Ocean along Japan.

References

 Spry, J.F. (1961). The sea shells of Dar es Salaam: Gastropods. Tanganyika Notes and Records 56

External links
 Link, D.H.F. (1807-1808). Beschreibung der Naturalien-Sammlung der Universität zu Rostock. Adlers Erben
 Reeve, L. A. (1846). Monograph of the genus Purpura. In: Conchologia iconica, or, illustrations of the shells of molluscous animals, Vol. 3. L. Reeve & Co., London. Pls. 1-13 and unpaginated text
 

armigera
Gastropods described in 1807